Events in the year 2020 in Jamaica.

Incumbents
 Monarch: Elizabeth II
 Governor-General: Patrick Allen
 Prime Minister: Andrew Holness
 Chief Justice: Bryan Sykes

Events

28 January – 2020 Caribbean earthquake

10 March – First confirmed case of COVID-19 in Jamaica

Deaths

January to April
27 February – Irvino English, footballer (b. 1977).
16 March – Lynford Anderson, Jamaican-born American music engineer and producer (b. 1941).
23 March – Apple Gabriel, reggae singer (b. 1955).
27 March
Bob Andy, reggae singer, songwriter and actor (b. 1944).
Delroy Washington, British-Jamaican reggae singer (b. 1952).
4 April – Ken Farnum, cyclist (b. 1931).
6 April – Adlin Mair-Clarke, athlete (1941).
8 April – Lois Kelly Miller, actress (b. 1917).
13 April – Gil Bailey, radio broadcaster (b. 1936).

May to August
5 May – Millie Small, singer (b. 1947).
21 May – Bobby Digital, reggae and dancehall record producer (b. 1961).
29 May – Shahine Robinson, politician, MP (b. 1953/1954).
18 June – Hux Brown, guitarist (b. 1944).
21 July – Dobby Dobson, reggae singer and record producer (b. 1942).
23 July – Paulette Wilson, human rights activist (b. 1956).
18 August – Patsy Robertson, 86, diplomat and journalist.
20 August – Tony Hart, 87, businessman, philanthropist, and politician (b. 1932).

September to December
11 September – Toots Hibbert, 77, singer (Toots and the Maytals) and songwriter ("54-46 That's My Number", "Pressure Drop", "Monkey Man"); COVID-19.
15 September – Johnny Gayle, 96, cricket umpire.
17 September – Donald Keith Duncan, 80, politician, MP (1976–1983, 2007–2016); COVID-19.
6 October – Bunny Lee, 79, reggae producer.
15 December – Albert Griffiths, 74, reggae musician (The Gladiators).

See also

COVID-19 pandemic in Jamaica
2020 in the Caribbean
2020 Atlantic hurricane season

References

 
2020s in Jamaica
Years of the 21st century in Jamaica
Jamaica
Jamaica